Saint-Étienne Métropole is the métropole, an intercommunal structure, centred on the city of Saint-Étienne. It is located in the Loire department, in the Auvergne-Rhône-Alpes region, central France. It was created in January 2018, replacing the previous Communauté urbaine Saint-Étienne Métropole. Its area is 723.5 km2. Its population was 404,607 in 2018, of which 173,089 in Saint-Étienne proper.

History 
In 1995, Saint-Étienne Métropole was created as a communauté de communes, consisting of 22 communes. This was converted into a communauté d'agglomération in 2001, expanded to 43 communes in 2003 and to 45 communes in 2013. The communauté d'agglomération was converted to a communauté urbaine in January 2016. It was expanded to 53 communes in January 2017. The communauté urbaine was converted to a métropole in January 2018.

Composition
The Saint-Étienne Métropole consists of the following 53 communes:

Aboën
Andrézieux-Bouthéon
Caloire
Cellieu
Chagnon
Chambœuf
Le Chambon-Feugerolles
Châteauneuf
Dargoire
Doizieux
L'Étrat
Farnay
Firminy
Fontanès
La Fouillouse
Fraisses
Genilac
La Gimond
La Grand-Croix
L'Horme
Lorette
Marcenod
Pavezin
La Ricamarie
Rive-de-Gier
Roche-la-Molière
Rozier-Côtes-d'Aurec
Saint-Bonnet-les-Oules
Saint-Chamond
Saint-Christo-en-Jarez
Sainte-Croix-en-Jarez
Saint-Étienne
Saint-Galmier
Saint-Genest-Lerpt
Saint-Héand
Saint-Jean-Bonnefonds
Saint-Joseph
Saint-Martin-la-Plaine
Saint-Maurice-en-Gourgois
Saint-Nizier-de-Fornas
Saint-Paul-en-Cornillon
Saint-Paul-en-Jarez
Saint-Priest-en-Jarez
Saint-Romain-en-Jarez
Sorbiers
La Talaudière
Tartaras
La Terrasse-sur-Dorlay
La Tour-en-Jarez
Unieux
Valfleury
La Valla-en-Gier
Villars

See also 
Transport in Rhône-Alpes

References

External links
Saint-Étienne Métropole

Metropolis in France
Cities in Auvergne-Rhône-Alpes
Intercommunalities of Loire